Clement Russo (born 20 January 1995) is a French road and cyclo-cross cyclist, who currently rides for UCI ProTeam . He competed in the men's under-23 event at the 2016 UCI Cyclo-cross World Championships  in Heusden-Zolder. In August 2020, he was named in the startlist for the 2020 Tour de France.

Major results

Road

2017
 2nd Overall Tour de Beauce
 4th Overall Tour de Gironde
2018
 9th Polynormande
2019
 1st  Overall Vuelta a la Comunidad de Madrid
 9th Overall Tour de Bretagne
 9th Tour de l'Eurométropole
 9th La Roue Tourangelle
2021
 4th Scheldeprijs
2022
 9th Dwars door het Hageland

Grand Tour general classification results timeline

Cyclo-cross

2012–2013
 1st  National Junior Championships
 Junior Coupe de France
1st Saverne
1st Besançon
 2nd  UEC European Junior Championships
2014–2015
 2nd National Under-23 Championships
 Under-23 Coupe de France
2nd Besançon
2nd Sisteron
3rd Lanarvily
2015–2016
 1st  National Under-23 Championships
 Under-23 Coupe de France
1st Albi
1st Quelneuc
 UCI Under-23 World Cup
3rd Caubergcross
3rd Hoogerheide
2016–2017
 1st Overall Under-23 Coupe de France
1st Erôme Gervans
1st Bagnoles de l'Orne
1st Nommay
 3rd Overall UCI Under-23 World Cup
2nd Heusden-Zolder
2nd Hoogerheide
 2nd National Under-23 Championships
 3rd La Mézière
2019–2020
 3rd Valencia

References

External links

1995 births
Living people
Cyclo-cross cyclists
French male cyclists
Cyclists from Lyon